The National Stadium, also known as the Bird's Nest, is an 80,000-capacity stadium in Beijing. The stadium was jointly designed by architects Jacques Herzog and Pierre de Meuron from Basel-based architecture team Herzog & de Meuron, project architect Stefan Marbach, artist Ai Weiwei, and CADG, which was led by chief architect Li Xinggang. The stadium was designed for use throughout the 2008 Summer Olympics and Paralympics. It was used again in the 2022 Winter Olympics and Paralympics. The Bird's Nest sometimes has temporary large screens installed at the stands.

History

Located at the Olympic Green, the stadium cost US$428 million. The design was awarded to a submission from the Swiss architecture firm Herzog & de Meuron in April 2003 after a bidding process that included 13 final submissions. The design, which originated from the study of Chinese ceramics, implemented steel beams in order to hide supports for the retractable roof; giving the stadium the appearance of a bird's nest. Leading Chinese artist Ai Weiwei was the artistic consultant on the project. The retractable roof was later removed from the design after inspiring the stadium's most recognizable aspect. Ground was broken on 24 December 2003 and the stadium officially opened on 28 June 2008. A shopping mall and a hotel are planned to be constructed to increase use of the stadium, which has had trouble attracting events, football and otherwise, after the Olympics.

Bidding
In 2001, before Beijing had been awarded the games, the city held a bidding process to select the best arena design. Multiple requirements including the ability for post-Olympics use, a retractable roof, and low maintenance costs, were required of each design. The entry list was narrowed to thirteen final designs. Of the final thirteen, Li Xinggang of China Architecture Design and Research Group (CADG), said after he placed the model of the "nest" proposal at the exhibition hall and saw the rival entries he thought to himself, "We will win this." The model was approved as the top design by a professional panel and later exhibited to the public. Once again, it was selected as the top design. The "nest scheme" design became official in April 2003.

Design

Beijing National Stadium (BNS) was a joint venture among architects Jacques Herzog and Pierre de Meuron of Herzog & de Meuron, project architect Stefan Marbach and CADG, which was led by chief architect Li Xinggang. During their first meeting in 2003, at Basel, the group decided to do something unlike Herzog and de Meuron had traditionally designed. "China wanted to have something new for this very important stadium," Li stated. In an effort to design a stadium that was "porous" while also being "a collective building, a public vessel", the team studied Chinese ceramics. This line of thought brought the team to the "nest scheme". The stadium consists of two independent structures, standing 50 feet apart: a red concrete seating bowl and the outer steel frame around it.

In an attempt to hide steel supports for the retractable roof, required in the bidding process, the team developed the "random-looking additional steel" to blend the supports into the rest of the stadium. Twenty-four trussed columns encase the inner bowl, each one weighing 1,000 tons. Despite the random appearance of the Stadium, each half is nearly symmetrical. After a collapse of a roof at the Charles de Gaulle Airport, Beijing reviewed all major projects. It was decided to eliminate the retractable roof, the original inspiration for the "nest" design, as well as 9,000 seats from the design. The removal of the elements helped to bring the project under the reduced construction budget of $290 million, from an original $500 million. With the removal of the retractable roof, the building was lightened, which helped it stand up to seismic activity; however, the upper section of the roof was altered to protect fans from weather. Enerpac was granted the contract to perform the stage lifting and lowering of the stadium roof as part of the construction process. China National Electric Engineering Co. Ltd. CNEEC and China National Mechanical Engineering Company lifted and welded the steel structure. Due to the stadium's outward appearance, it was nicknamed "The Bird's Nest". The phrase was first used by Herzog & de Meuron, though the pair still believes "there should be many ways of perceiving a building." The use is a compliment Li explained, "In China, a bird's nest is very expensive, something you eat on special occasions."

Construction
Construction of the stadium proceeded in several distinct phases, the first phase involving the construction of a concrete supporting structure upon the concrete foundations laid for the construction site. This was followed by the phased installation of the curved steel frame surrounding the stadium, which is largely self-supporting. This phased installation involved the interconnection of sections of the curved steel frame that were constructed in Shanghai and transported to Beijing for assembly and welding. The entire structure of interconnected sections was welded together as the primary means of interconnection used to assemble the entire surrounding nest structure. Upon removal of the supporting columns used for the purpose of expediting the assembly of the interconnecting sections, the completed nest structure as a whole settled approximately 27 cm to attain full stability before the interior design and construction of the stadium could be installed and completed.

Completion

Ground was broken, at the Olympic Green, for Beijing National Stadium on 24 December 2003. At its height, 17,000 construction workers worked on the stadium. Portraits of 143 migrant workers at the construction site were featured in the book Workers (Gong Ren) by artist Helen Couchman. On 1 January 2008, The Times reported that 10 workers had died throughout construction; despite denial from the Chinese government. However, in a story the following week, Reuters, with the support of the Chinese government, reported that only two workers had died. All 121,000 tons of steel were made in China. On 14 May 2008 the grass field of 7,811 square meters was laid in 24 hours. The field is a modular turf system by GreenTech ITM.
Building the Beijing Olympic Field Beijing National Stadium officially opened at a ceremony on 28 June 2008.

Features and events

The eastern and western stands of Beijing National Stadium are higher than northern and southern stands, in order to improve sightlines. A 24-hour-per-day rainwater collector is located near the stadium; after water is purified, it is used throughout and around the stadium. Pipes placed under the playing surface gather heat in the winter to warm the stadium and disperse heat in the summer to cool the stadium. The stadium's design originally called for a capacity of 100,000 people; however 9,000 were removed during a simplification of the design. The new total of 91,000 was shaved further when 11,000 temporary seats were removed after the 2008 Olympics; bringing the stadium's capacity to 80,000. Temperature and airflow of every surface were optimized to increase ventilation.

Beijing National Stadium hosted the opening and closing ceremonies, athletic events, and football final of the 2008 Summer Olympics from 8 to 24 August 2008. The stadium also hosted the Opening and Closing ceremonies and athletic events of the 2008 Summer Paralympics from 6 to 17 September 2008. Though designed for track & field events of the Olympics, the stadium continues to host sporting events, such as football, afterwards. A shopping mall and a hotel, with rooms overlooking the field, are planned to help increase use after the Olympics. Li stated, "This will become the most important public space in Beijing."

Although ignored by the Chinese media, design consultant Ai Weiwei has voiced his anti-Olympics views and distanced himself from the project, saying, "I've already forgotten about it. I turn down all the demands to have photographs with it," and that it is part of a "pretend smile" of bad taste.

Football
China national football team hasn't played any matches since the opening of the stadium.

On its first anniversary, 8 August 2009, the stadium hosted a performance of the opera Turandot, and the 2009 Supercoppa Italiana (Italian Super Cup) final, the traditional curtain raiser to the Italian football league season. In August 2011, the Bird's Nest once again hosted the Supercoppa Italiana, the stadium's second in three years, and also in 2012.

The Beijing Guo’an football club was scheduled to play at the stadium, but later backed out of their agreement, citing the embarrassment of using an 80,000+ seat venue for games that routinely draw only slightly more than 10,000.

In July 2010, the stadium hosted a friendly football match between Football League Championship team Birmingham City and Beijing Guoan as a part of Birmingham's pre-season trip to China, homeland of the club's owner Carson Yeung. Birmingham City recorded a 1–0 victory in the game.

Arsenal and Manchester City played each other in the inaugural 'China Cup', a one-off match in Beijing's played on 27 July 2012. Manchester City won the match with a score of 2–0.

On 25 July 2016 Manchester City were scheduled to meet Manchester United as part of the 2016 International Champions Cup. However the game was cancelled due to heavy rain soaking the pitch, poor pitch conditions due to fungus and the pitch being relaid with turf.

On 22 July 2017, Arsenal and Chelsea played against each other in a friendly match.

After China became the host of the 2023 AFC Asian Cup on 4 June 2019 which the stadium was originally intended as the Beijing venue, but it was replaced by Workers' Stadium on 4 January 2020. However, on 14 May 2022, AFC announced that China would not be able to host the tournament due to the exceptional circumstances caused by the COVID-19 pandemic.

Other sports events
The stadium hosted the 2009 Race of Champions motor racing carnival. In 2014 and 2015, the FIA Formula E Championship motor racing series hosted the Beijing ePrix at the Beijing Olympic Park.

On 1 November 2010, the IAAF announced that the 2015 World Championships in Athletics would take place at the Beijing National Stadium.

On 29 July 2017, the stadium hosted Monster Jam and the Stadium Super Trucks, marking the first Chinese race for both racing series. Chinese driver Li Ya Tao was among the ten drivers competing in the Stadium Super Truck race.

On 4 November 2017, the stadium hosted the League of Legends World Championship 2017 Finals.

Concerts
Jackie Chan was the first artist to hold a pop concert at the stadium on 2 April 2009.

"King of Chinese Pop" Wang Leehom held the first solo pop concert at the stadium on 14 April 2012 for a sold-out crowd of 90,000 fans. Taiwanese band Mayday performed at the stadium for two nights from 29 to 30 April 2012, as part of their Mayday No Where Tour. They were the first band ever to hold two-day concerts at the stadium. They returned in August 2013 to hold one show as part of their Mayday Now Here Tour. They came back to the stadium to hold their three shows of their Just Rock It!!! World Tour in August 2016 and five shows of their Mayday Life Tour in August 2017 and 2018. They returned in August 2019 to hold three shows of their Just Rock It!!! World Tour to commemorate the 20th anniversary of the release of their first album in 1999.

Korean pop artists under S.M. Entertainment including Kangta, BoA, TVXQ, Super Junior (Super Junior-M), Girls' Generation, SHINee, f(x), EXO, Zhang Liyin, and Tasty performed at the stadium for the first time on 19 October 2013 as part of the SMTown Live World Tour III.

Chinese pop star Jason Zhang held the Future Live concert at the stadium on 11 August 2018.

Chinese pop and rock star Hua Chenyu was the first solo artist under 30 to hold a concert, let alone two, on 8 September 2018, to 9 September 2018.

Since 2014, the finals for the Chinese singing competition The Voice of China and Sing! China, based on the hit international singing competition The Voice, were held at the stadium. The finals were usually held on either 7 October or on a Sunday of the Golden Week to commemorate the event.

Pageants
In 4th quarter of 2017, this stadium is also open for both local & international pageant events.

Post-Olympics legacy
On 12 January 2009 the venue's owners announced plans for the stadium to anchor a shopping and entertainment complex. These plans, having been developed by operator Citic Group, were projected to take three to five years to achieve. The stadium also continues to function as a tourist attraction, while hosting sports and entertainment events. However, by 2013 the stadium had fallen into visual disrepair and was criticized as appearing rusty and neglected by visitors to Beijing.

In 2009, the stadium was the site of a Pit Stop for the double-length penultimate leg in the 14th season of The Amazing Race. In 2010, an Olympic-themed Detour was held here in the fifth leg of the first season of The Amazing Race: China Rush. Later in 2016, the first leg of the third season of The Amazing Race China featured a Roadblock where a team member reenacted a dancing segment from the opening ceremony.

The National Stadium was intended to be a Monument of New China, expected to be visited by millions of tourists and showcased through an array of media representations.

In spite of the lack of significant events, the stadium appears to be quite profitable, drawing some 20,000 to 30,000 people a day at the price of a 50 yuan admission. In 2010 it was used as a snow theme park. The venue costs approximately $9 million to maintain per year.

The stadium was used for the finals of the 2017 League of Legends World Championship. This included performances by Jay Chou.

The stadium was used to host "The Great Journey," an art performance marking the 100th anniversary of the founding of the Communist Party of China on 1 July 2021.

2022 Winter Olympics

The stadium was used for the opening and closing ceremonies of 2022 Winter Olympics and 2022 Winter Paralympics. It is the only stadium to host both the Summer and Winter Olympics and Paralympics opening and closing ceremonies.

See also
 Workers' Stadium

References

Sources

External links

Beijing2008.cn profile
Beijing National Stadium Official site  

Venues of the 2008 Summer Olympics
Venues of the 2022 Winter Olympics
Athletics (track and field) venues in China
Sports venues completed in 2008
Herzog & de Meuron buildings
High-tech architecture
Lattice shell structures
China, People's Republic of
Olympic athletics venues
Olympic football venues
Olympic stadiums
Postmodern architecture in China
Sports venues in Beijing
Ai Weiwei buildings
2008 establishments in China
Buildings and structures in Chaoyang District, Beijing
Esports venues in China
Football venues in Beijing